Beauce is a natural region in northern France, located between the rivers Seine and Loire. It now comprises the Eure-et-Loir département and parts of Loiret, Essonne and Loir-et-Cher. 

The region shared the history of the province of Orléanais and the county of Chartres, which is its only major city. Beauce is one of France's most productive agricultural areas.

The name derives from Latin Belsia or Belsa, said by Virgilius Maro Grammaticus to be a Gaulish word meaning "grass plain, cultivated plain." It was formerly spelled La Beausse.

It is the setting of Émile Zola's novel La Terre (The Earth).  The region also gives its name to the Beauce region of Quebec.

References

External link

Landforms of Essonne
Landforms of Eure-et-Loir
Landforms of Loir-et-Cher
Landforms of Loiret
Landforms of Yvelines
Natural regions of France
Plains of France
Landforms of Île-de-France
Landforms of Centre-Val de Loire
Chartres